Douglas Paul Peterson (born October 15, 1948) is an American politician in the state of Minnesota. He served in the Minnesota House of Representatives.

References

Democratic Party members of the Minnesota House of Representatives
1948 births
Living people
People from Madison, Minnesota
Augustana University alumni